This list of Ramsar sites in the Republic of Ireland includes wetlands that are considered to be of international importance under the Ramsar Convention. For a full list of all Ramsar sites worldwide, see List of Ramsar wetlands of international importance.

List of Ramsar sites

See also
 Ramsar Convention
 List of Ramsar sites worldwide
 List of Special Protection Areas in the Republic of Ireland

References



 
Ireland
Ramsar